The year 2001 is the fifth year in the history of M-1 Global, a mixed martial arts promotion based in Russia. In 2001 M-1 Global held 5 events beginning with, M-1 MFC: Russia vs. the World 1.

Events list

M-1 MFC: Russia vs. the World 1

M-1 MFC: Russia vs. the World 1 was an event held on April 27, 2001 at The Palace of sport "Jubileiny" in Saint Petersburg, Russia.

Results

M-1 MFC: Exclusive Fight Night 2

M-1 MFC: Exclusive Fight Night 2 was an event held on June 28, 2001 in Saint Petersburg, Russia.

Results

M-1 MFC: Exclusive Fight Night 3

M-1 MFC: Exclusive Fight Night 3 was an event held on September 27, 2001 in Saint Petersburg, Russia.

Results

M-1 MFC: Russia vs. the World 2

M-1 MFC: Russia vs. the World 2 was an event held on November 11, 2001 in Saint Petersburg, Russia.

Results

M-1 MFC: Exclusive Fight Night 4

M-1 MFC: Exclusive Fight Night 4 was an event held on December 27, 2001 at The Arena Fighting Club in Saint Petersburg, Russia.

Results

See also 
 M-1 Global

References

M-1 Global events
2001 in mixed martial arts